Dennis Eadie (14 January 1869 – 10 June 1928) was a British stage actor who also appeared in three films during the silent era. Eadie was a leading actor of the British theatre, appearing in plays by Edward Knoblauch and Louis N. Parker. In 1916 he became the first man to play the British prime minister Benjamin Disraeli in a feature film. In 1918 he starred in the hit West End comedy The Freedom of the Seas by Walter C. Hackett.

In 1928 Eadie played Hanaud in a London revival of the popular play At the Villa Rose.

Selected filmography
 The Man Who Stayed at Home (1915)
 Disraeli (1916)

Bibliography
 Davis, Tracy C. The Economics of the British Stage 1800-1914. Cambridge University Press, 2007.

References

External links

1869 births
1928 deaths
Scottish male silent film actors
Scottish male stage actors
Male actors from Glasgow
20th-century Scottish male actors